Thomas Chideu (born 30 October 1996) is a Zimbabwean football striker who plays for Forest Rangers F.C. He registered his only international cap for Zimbabwe in 2015.

References

1996 births
Living people
Zimbabwean footballers
Association football forwards
Highlanders F.C. players
Cape Town Spurs F.C. players
Lamontville Golden Arrows F.C. players
F.C. Platinum players
Bulawayo Chiefs F.C. players
Zimbabwe international footballers
South African Premier Division players
Zimbabwean expatriate footballers
Expatriate soccer players in South Africa
Zimbabwean expatriate sportspeople in South Africa
Zimbabwe A' international footballers
2020 African Nations Championship players
Zimbabwean expatriate sportspeople in Zambia
Expatriate footballers in Zambia
Forest Rangers F.C. players